Vijay Barse (born 5 February, 1946) is a social worker from Nagpur, India. He is known for having founded Slum Football, an organisation which uplifts underprivileged children through football. His efforts have led to upliftment of underprivileged children from Nagpur using football as a source.

Career 
Barse worked as a sports teacher in Hislop College, Nagpur. In 2001, he founded the Slum Soccer organisation after spotting a couple of underprivileged children playing with a makeshift football, inspiring him to start a soccer club. He established the Krida Vikas Sanstha Nagpur (KSVN) with his wife, Ranjana Barse, and son, Abhijeet Barse.

Vijay Barse's story was also unveiled in Season 3's 1st episode of TV show Satyamev Jayate which was hosted by Actor Aamir Khan.

In popular culture 
Barse's as well as Slum Soccer's life has been depicted in the Bollywood movie Jhund directed and written by Nagraj Manjule. Barse's character was played by Bollywood actor Amitabh Bachchan .

References 

1945 births
Indian social workers
Social workers from Maharashtra
Living people